The Shelly Archeological District is an area encompassing a number of historical archaeological sites in Gloucester County, Virginia.  The district, which covers  near the confluence of Carter's Creek and the York River, includes at least 29 distinct historic and prehistoric sites, including an extensive shell midden, which gave the area its name.  The site is one that was proposed in the 19th and 20th centuries as the site of Werowocomoco.  The area also includes remains of 17th-century English settlements.

The district was listed on the National Register of Historic Places in 1990.

See also
National Register of Historic Places listings in Gloucester County, Virginia

References

National Register of Historic Places in Gloucester County, Virginia
Archaeological sites on the National Register of Historic Places in Virginia
Historic districts on the National Register of Historic Places in Virginia